Sweet Talker is a 1991 Australian film starring Bryan Brown and Karen Allen. It was directed by Michael Jenkins who later described it as:
A real general audience film, a fairly gentle film about some relationships, almost father-son relationships, single mum relationship with her son. It's not what I would call a film that has major clout to it. It's an entertainment film, but what it says is not bad. It's a soft film - it doesn't really go out there pretending it's saying anything world-shattering... In this industry quite a few things are haphazard. Sweet Talker is one of the more haphazard projects that has come along.

The film's soundtrack, scored and performed by British singer/songwriter Richard Thompson was released by Capitol Records the same year the film was released.

References

External links

Sweet Talker at Oz Movies

Australian comedy films
1990s English-language films
Films directed by Michael Jenkins
1990s Australian films